Alessio Guarini (born 5 April 1985) is a former Italian long jumper.

Career
Two-time national champion at senior level in long jump in 2009 and 2013.

References

External links
 

1997 births
Living people
Italian male long jumpers
Athletics competitors of Fiamme Oro